John S. Gray may refer to:

John S. Gray (Idaho) (1851–1902), Idaho Lieutenant Governor and politician
John S. Gray (Michigan) (1841–1906), candymaker, businessman, and first president of Ford Motor Company

See also
John Gray (disambiguation)